Enrico Oldoini (born 4 May 1946) is an Italian director and screenwriter.

Born in La Spezia, in 1966 Enrico Oldoini started attending the Silvio D'Amico National Academy of Dramatic Art in Rome, without graduating. From 1972, he then worked as an assistant director and occasional actor; two years later he debuted as a screenwriter working for the TV series Vivere insieme. A  specialized screenwriter of comedy films, in 1984 he debuted as film director, and most of his films were box office successes in Italy;  in the 1990s he focused his activities on television.

Filmography 
 Cuori nella tormenta (1984)
 Lui è peggio di me (1984)
 Yuppies 2 (1986)
 Bellifreschi (1987)
 Bye Bye Baby (1988)
 Una botta di vita (1988)
 Vacanze di Natale '90 (1990)
 Vacanze di Natale '91 (1991)
 Anni 90 (1992)
 Anni 90: Parte II (1993)
 Miracolo italiano (1994)
 Un bugiardo in paradiso (1998)
 13 at a Table (2004)
 La fidanzata di papà (2008)
 I mostri oggi (2009)

References

External links 
 

1946 births
Italian film directors
Italian television directors
Italian screenwriters
Italian male screenwriters
People from La Spezia
Living people
Accademia Nazionale di Arte Drammatica Silvio D'Amico alumni